L'île du Sud (South Island, l'île Boisées) is an island located in the St. Brandon archipelago. It is one of the two islands (the other being Île Raphael) used as a base of operations for fishing activities by Raphael Fishing Company, the only active fishing company present in the area.

Shipwrecks
Twenty crew were rescued shortly after its grounding, and a salvage operation pumped the fuel from its tanks a few weeks later.
On 5 December 2022, the Taiwanese fishing vessel, 41 FV YU FENG 67, ran aground off L'île du Sud. Its crew of 20 were later rescued by local commercial fishing boats.

See also 
Mascarene Islands
St Brandon
Mauritius
Île Raphael
Avocaré Island
L'île du Gouvernement
L'Île Coco

References

External links
Australian Bureau of Meteorology - Understanding tropical cyclone categories

Regional specialized meteorological centres
India Meteorological Department – Bay of Bengal and the Arabian Sea
Météo-France – La Reunion – South Indian Ocean from 30°E to 90°E

Tropical cyclone warning centres
Australian Bureau of Meteorology . – South Indian Ocean & South Pacific Ocean from 90°E to 160°E, south of 10°S

Islands of St. Brandon
Outer Islands of Mauritius
Reefs of the Indian Ocean
Fishing areas of the Indian Ocean
Atolls of the Indian Ocean
2022 disasters in Africa
Maritime incidents in 2022